Epiperipatus bernali is a species of velvet worm in the family Peripatidae. This species has 31 or 32 pairs of legs.

References 

Onychophorans of tropical America
Onychophoran species
Animals described in 2021